Marcelo Garcia (born January 17, 1983) is a Brazilian submission grappler and a 4th degree black belt  Brazilian jiu-jitsu practitioner and coach. A highly decorated competitor, Garcia is widely considered to be one of the best grapplers in the world and arguably the best pound for pound submission grappler. Holding 5 World Jiu-Jitsu Championship and 4 ADCC Submission Fighting World Championship titles, Garcia is a member of the IBJJF Hall of Fame and the third BJJ athlete to be inducted into the ADCC Hall of Fame.

Biography 
Marcelo Garcia was born on 17 January 1983 in Formiga, Minas Gerais a small city in southeast Brazil. Garcia won the World Championships at all belt levels (blue, purple, brown) before receiving his black belt from Fabio Gurgel who he trained with in Sao Paulo, Brazil. 

At K-1 HERO'S Korea 2007, Garcia made his MMA debut. He lost this against Dae Won Kim twenty seconds into the second round by doctor's stoppage, due to a cut above his eye. In September 2008, Garcia opened up a Brazilian Jiu-Jitsu school in Pembroke Pines, a city in South Florida located between Miami and Fort Lauderdale. In September 2009, Garcia opened an academy in Manhattan, New York City. In November 2021, Garcia retired from competition, that same year he became the third person to be inducted into the ADCC Hall of Fame as a result of his record-setting four gold medals in his own weight division and his performances in the absolute division.

On January 19, 2023, Garcia revealed that he had been diagnosed with stomach cancer and would undergo chemotherapy and surgery to remove the tumour.

Instructor lineage 
Mitsuyo "Count Koma" Maeda → Carlos Gracie Sr. → Helio Gracie → Rolls Gracie → Romero "Jacare" Cavalcanti → Fabio Gurgel → Marcelo Garcia

Championships and accomplishments 
Garcia has won five world championship titles in Brazilian jiu-jitsu as a black belt in the middle-weight category. He has many submission grappling titles, including the ADCC Submission Wrestling World Championship. At ADCC, Garcia has won the 66–76 kg division four times (2003/2005/2007/2011), been awarded the most technical fighter twice (2003 and 2007) and won the best fight award in 2005. In 2005, he finished in third place in the absolute (open weight) division and in 2007 finished second in the absolute division. In ADCC 2009, Garcia finished second in his weight division, losing by points to Pablo Popovitch, whom he had defeated in the two previous finals.

Grappling 

2011
  ADCC World Championship (-77 kg)
  IBJJF World Championship (-82 kg)
2010
  IBJJF World Championship (-82 kg)
2009
  ADCC World Championship (-77 kg)
  IBJJF World Championship (-82 kg)
  ACBJJ World Cup (Absolute)
  ACBJJ World Cup (-75 kg)
2007
  ADCC World Championship (Absolute)
  ADCC World Championship (-77 kg)
  Grapplers Quest: Beast of the East (Superfight Tournament)
  IBJJF Pan American Championship (-82 kg)
2006
  PSL: X-Mission Superfight Winner
  IBJJF World Championship (Absolute)
  IBJJF World Championship (-82 kg)
  PSL: LA-Sub Superfight Winner
  CBJJ Brazilian National Championship (Absolute)
  CBJJ Brazilian National Championship (-82 kg)
2005
  Arnold Gracie Pro
  ADCC World Championship (Absolute)
  ADCC World Championship (-77 kg)
2004
  Arnold Gracie Pro
  IBJJF World Championship (Absolute)
  IBJJF World Championship (-82 kg)
  CBJJ Brazilian National Championship (Absolute)
  CBJJ Brazilian National Championship (-82 kg)
  Campos Submission Wrestling 3 (Absolute)
  Campos Submission Wrestling 3 (-88 kg)
2003
  ADCC World Championship (-77 kg)
  IBJJF World Championship (-82 kg)

Grappling record

Mixed martial arts record 

|-
| Loss
|align=center|0-1
| Kim Dae-Won
|TKO (cut)
|Hero's 2007
|
|align=center|2
|align=center|0:20
|Seoul, South Korea
|

See also 
List of Brazilian Jiu-Jitsu practitioners

References

External links 
 ADCC highlight video
 Highlight Video
 Marcelo Garcia BJJ/Grappling tournament videos
 www.mginaction.com
 Marcelo Garcia BJJ Heroes Page
 
 
 
 
 
 Marcelo Garcia Vespucio BJJ (GI) career on MARanking | Martial Arts Ranking

Brazilian male mixed martial artists
Lightweight mixed martial artists
Mixed martial artists utilizing Brazilian jiu-jitsu
Brazilian practitioners of Brazilian jiu-jitsu
Brazilian submission wrestlers
1983 births
Living people
Brazilian jiu-jitsu trainers
People awarded a black belt in Brazilian jiu-jitsu
World Brazilian Jiu-Jitsu Championship medalists
IBJJF Hall of Fame inductees
ADCC Hall of Fame inductees
Brazilian jiu-jitsu practitioners who have competed in MMA (men)